Odobești is a commune in Bacău County, Western Moldavia, Romania. It is composed of four villages: Bălușa, Ciuturești, Odobești and Tisa-Silvestri. These were part of Secuieni Commune until 2005, when they were split off to form a separate commune.

References

Communes in Bacău County
Localities in Western Moldavia